Tyler LeVander (also known as Baasick) is an American session drummer, composer and producer. LeVander attended Wilton High School in Wilton, Connecticut, and is a scholarship recipient and alumnus of Berklee College of Music in Boston, Massachusetts. There, he studied under Rod Morgenstein, Casey Scheuerell, Mike Mangini and Kenwood Dennard.

An accomplished studio recording and live drummer, LeVander has toured or recorded with acts including David Cassidy, Ethan Brosh, Ben Levin Group, Ken Yates, Don Lappin, Arthur Lipner, Juicy J and The Fates.

LeVander has performed internationally, at venues including the Hammersmith Apollo, the MGM Grand Garden Arena and the Superstar Theater.

In 2011, LeVander co-wrote and recorded Drama Dropout, The Fates' debut EP produced by Craig J. Snider. He appeared in a music video for The Fates' song "Miss America" alongside internet personality Meekakitty.

LeVander is an active film composer, and is the producer for multiple musical artists, including Zee, MarBar and Greg Oliveras.

LeVander is listed as a post-production and mastering engineer for Future Hits Music, a co-publisher of Spirit Music Group.

With MarBar
LeVander produces, records and performs with CT rapper MarBar under the pseudonym Baasick. With MarBar, he has toured prolifically, performing with artists including Juicy J, Kid Ink, Chris Webby, Apathy, and Spose.

Discography

Selected album appearances (as drummer)

 With Ben Levin Group
 Departure (2009)
 Pulse of a Nation (2010)
 Invisible Paradise (2012)

 With Ethan Brosh
 Live The Dream (2014)

 With Ken Yates
 The Backseat EP (2011)

 With The Fates
 Drama Dropout EP (2011)
 Princess of China (Single) (2011)
 Last Friday Night (Single) (2011)
 Skyscraper (Single) (2011)

 With Burn The Fens 
 Crown (2002)

Selected album credits (as producer)

 MarBar
 Lighters EP (2013)
 Droppleganger (2014)

 Greg Oliveras
 Envision A World EP (2014)

References

Living people
Berklee College of Music alumni
American music arrangers
People from Wilton, Connecticut
American film score composers
Progressive rock drummers
Progressive metal musicians
Jazz fusion drummers
American rock drummers
1990 births
21st-century American drummers
Wilton High School alumni